"Bleed the Freak" is a song by American rock band Alice in Chains and the third single from their first album Facelift (1990). The single was released in vinyl format only. A demo version of the song was included on the box set Music Bank (1999).

Lyrics
In the liner notes of 1999's Music Bank box set collection, guitarist Jerry Cantrell said of the song:
The song is us against the world, those people who put you down: "I put up with many years of you putting us down and watching us bleed, now I'd like to see you bleed some back."

Music video
Leading up to the release of Live in 2000, footage from a 1990 performance of the song at the Moore Theatre in Seattle was used as a promotional music video. This same performance is taken from the home video release Live Facelift.

Live performances
The song is a fan favourite and was frequently played as an opener for shows in 2006. A live performance of "Bleed the Freak" can be found on the live album Live. The same performance of the song is also included on the home video release Live Facelift.

Track listing

Personnel
Layne Staleylead vocals
Jerry Cantrellguitar, backing vocals
Mike Starrbass
Sean Kinneydrums

References

External links

1990 songs
1991 singles
Alice in Chains songs
Columbia Records singles
Songs written by Jerry Cantrell